Vanessa Grimberg (born 28 January 1993) is a German swimmer. At the 2016 Summer Olympics in Rio de Janeiro, she competed as a member of Germany's women's 4 x 100 metre medley relay team. The team finished 12th in the heats and did not qualify for the final.

References 

1993 births
Living people
German female swimmers
Swimmers at the 2016 Summer Olympics
Olympic swimmers of Germany